Harilal is an Indian name. It may refer to:

Harilal Dhruv, Indian lawyer and poet.
Harilal Gandhi,  eldest son of Mohandas Karamchand Gandhi.
Harilal Jekisundas Kania, Chief Justice of India.
Harilal Madhavjibhai Patel, Indian politician.
Harilal Manilal Patel, Fijian lawyer and politician.
Harilal Upadhyay, Gujarati novelist and poet.
Chimanlal Harilal Setalvad, Indian barrister and jurist.

Indian masculine given names